Oktovianus Maniani (born 27 October 1990 in Jayapura, Indonesia) is an Indonesian tarkam footballer who plays as a winger for Liga 2 club PSBS Biak. Popularly known simply as "Okto," he gained nationwide popularity in his early caps for the national team, mainly during the 2010 AFF Suzuki Cup, where he is considered one of the contributing players along with teammate Irfan Bachdim.  He is considered one of ten Asia players that could hit in Europe by ESPN Soccernet.

Personal life 
Okto was born in Jayapura, Papua, to Benjamin Maniani, a fisherman, and Dorince May, both indigenous Papuans. Okto spent his childhood helping his father fishing in the beach of Hamidi, Papua. He is married to Meriam Magdalena Worumboy, and together they have 2 children, Benyamin Elia Maniani and Carien Christine Maniani.

Club career 
On 23 December 2014, he signed with Pusamania Borneo.

On 30 January 2016, he signed with Carsae. But due to administrative problems, he just appeared four times and then he became free agent.

International career 
His first cap for Indonesia was in a friendly match against Uruguay on 8 October 2010, where he played as a substitute. His well performance in the match led him being placed in the starting lineup by coach Alfred Riedl in another friendly game four days later against Maldives where he scored his first goal for the national team. After the 2010 AFF Suzuki Cup, Okto is part of the under-23 team which competed in the Pre-Olympic Tournament and the 2011 Southeast Asian Games.

Career statistics

International

International goals

Style of play 
Okto is well known for his blistering pace and could easily exposed the opponent's defender via his powerful pace and speed.

Honours

Club 
Sriwijaya
 Indonesian Inter Island Cup: 2010
 Indonesian Community Shield: 2010

International 
Indonesia
 AFF Championship runner-up: 2010
 Southeast Asian Games  Silver medal: 2011
 Islamic Solidarity Games  Silver medal : 2013

Individual 
 Piala Indonesia Best Rising Star: 2008–09
 Southeast Asian Games Most Valuable Player: 2011

References

External links 
 

1990 births
Living people
Papuan people
People from Jayapura
Indonesian footballers
Indonesian Christians
Perserang Serang players
PSMS Medan players
Persidafon Dafonsoro players
Persitara Jakarta Utara players
Sriwijaya F.C. players
Persiram Raja Ampat players
Persiter Ternate players
PS Barito Putera players
Perseru Serui players
Badak Lampung F.C. players
Borneo F.C. players
Arema F.C. players
Persiba Balikpapan players
Liga 2 (Indonesia) players
Liga 1 (Indonesia) players
Indonesian expatriate sportspeople in East Timor
Expatriate footballers in East Timor
Indonesian expatriate footballers
Indonesia youth international footballers
Indonesia international footballers
Association football wingers
Southeast Asian Games silver medalists for Indonesia
Southeast Asian Games medalists in football
Competitors at the 2011 Southeast Asian Games
Sportspeople from Papua